The Agri are a Hindu caste found in Mumbai, Thane District, Raigad District and Palghar district in the state of Maharashtra. The Agri population numbered around 416,000 in India in year 1931  They are mainly involved in fishing, salt making, and rice farming.  They speak the Agri dialect of Maharashtrian Konkani and write in the Devanagari script. They are Hindus, worship all the Hindu deities and observe Hindu festivals such as Holi, Ganapati, Dussera, Diwali, Hanuman Jayanti, Datta Jayanti, Shiv Jayanti and others.

See also 
Agaria

References

Social groups of Maharashtra
Indian castes